The Garden Wall is a steep alpine area within Glacier National Park well known during the summer months to be heavily covered in dozens of species of flowering plants and shrubs. The Going-to-the-Sun Road also passes through portions of the Garden Wall northwest of Logan Pass. The Weeping Wall is a short stretch of the Going-to-the-Sun Road where water cascades over the Garden Wall to the roadway below. The Garden Wall is an arête or rock spine that separates the Many Glacier region of the park from Lake McDonald valley.

References

Glacier National Park (U.S.)
Geography of Flathead County, Montana
Going-to-the-Sun Road